Foosland is a village in Champaign County, Illinois, United States. The population was 75 at the 2020 census. The village is named after William Foos, who owned 3,500 acres in the area in the 1840s.

Geography
Foosland is located in the northwest corner of Champaign County three miles southeast of Illinois Route 54. Gibson City lies nine miles to the northeast along Route 54 and Champaign is approximately 22 miles to the southeast. Lone Tree Creek, a tributary to the Sangamon River, flows past the south side of the community.

Demographics

As of the 2020 census there were 75 people, 24 households, and 10 families residing in the village. The racial makeup of the village was 96.00% White, 2.67% from other races, and 1.33% from two or more races. Hispanic or Latino of any race were 2.67% of the population.

There were 24 households, out of which 45.83% had children under the age of 18 living with them, 37.50% were married couples living together, 4.17% had a female householder with no husband present, and 58.33% were non-families. 37.50% of all households were made up of individuals, and 29.17% had someone living alone who was 65 years of age or older. The average household size was 3.10 and the average family size was 2.21.

The village's age distribution consisted of 20.8% under the age of 18, 0.0% from 18 to 24, 17% from 25 to 44, 30.1% from 45 to 64, and 32.1% who were 65 years of age or older. The median age was 56.1 years. For every 100 females, there were 89.3 males. For every 100 females age 18 and over, there were 121.1 males.

The median income for a household in the village was $50,833, and the median income for a family was $86,250. Males had a median income of $46,250 versus $26,250 for females. The per capita income for the village was $27,058. No families and 9.4% of the population were below the poverty line, including none of those under age 18 and 29.4% of those age 65 or over.

History
Foosland was founded in 1874 and a post office was established on June 19 that year. The town is named after William Foos, an Ohioan who was instrumental in the establishment of the town, and in the placement there of a station of the Chicago-Paducah railroad. He bought and drained about 3,500 acres of nearby land and, through a local superintendent, managed a tenant farming operation. Foosland was incorporated in 1959. Champaign County Judge Frederick S. Green approved a canvass of votes of elected officers. The first mayor was Paul Verkler.

References

Villages in Champaign County, Illinois
Villages in Illinois
Populated places established in 1959
1959 establishments in Illinois